Events from the year 1779 in the United States.

Incumbents
President of the Second Continental Congress: John Jay (until September 28), Samuel Huntington (starting September 28)

Events

January–March

 January 22 – American Revolutionary War: Claudius Smith is hanged at Goshen, Orange County, New York for supposed acts of terrorism upon the people of the surrounding communities.
 January 29 – After a second petition for partition from its residents, the North Carolina General Assembly abolishes Bute County, North Carolina (established 1764) by dividing it and naming the northern portion Warren County (for Revolutionary War hero Joseph Warren) and the southern portion Franklin County (for Benjamin Franklin).  The General Assembly also establishes Warrenton (also named for Joseph Warren) to be the county seat of Warren County and Louisburg (named for Louis XVI of France) to be the county seat of Franklin County.
 February 14
 British Captain James Cook is killed on the Sandwich Islands (later known as the Hawaiian Islands) on his third and last voyage.
 American Revolutionary War: Battle of Kettle Creek – A Patriot militia decisively defeats and scatters a Loyalist militia that was on its way to British-controlled Augusta, Georgia.
 February 23-25 – American Revolutionary War: Battle of Vincennes.

April–June
 May 10-24 – American Revolutionary War: Chesapeake raid.
 June 1 – American Revolutionary War: Benedict Arnold is court-martialed for malfeasance in his treatment of government property.
 June 16 – American Revolutionary War: In support of the U.S., Spain declares war on England.

July–September

 July 16 – American Revolutionary War: Battle of Stony Point, United States forces led by General Anthony Wayne capture Stony Point, New York from British troops.
 July 22 – Battle of Minisink: The Goshen Militia is destroyed by Joseph Brant's forces.
 July 24 – American Revolutionary War: American forces led by Commodore Dudley Saltonstall launch the Penobscot Expedition in what is now Castine, Maine, resulting in the worst naval defeat in U.S. history until Pearl Harbor.
 September – Battle of Baton Rouge: Spanish troops under Bernardo de Galvez capture the city from the British.
 September 16–October 18 – American Revolutionary War: Siege of Savannah
 September 23 – American Revolution – Battle of Flamborough Head: The American ship Bonhomme Richard, commanded by John Paul Jones, engages the British ship Serapis.  The Bonhomme Richard sinks, but the Americans board the Serapis and other vessels, and are victorious.

October–December
 October 4 – The Fort Wilson Riot takes place.
 November 2 – The North Carolina General Assembly carves a new county from Dobbs County, North Carolina and names it Wayne County in honor of United States General Anthony Wayne.
 December 25 – Fort Nashborough, later to become Nashville, Tennessee, is founded by James Robertson.

Ongoing
 American Revolutionary War (1775–1783)

Births

 January 5 
 Stephen Decatur, U.S. Naval commander (died 1820)
 Zebulon Pike, General and explorer (died 1813)
 January 23 – Isaac C. Bates, United States Senator from Massachusetts from 1841 till 1845. (died 1845)
 August 1 – Francis Scott Key, author of The Star Spangled Banner (died 1843)
 August 6 – Henry M. Ridgely, United States Senator from Delaware from 1827 till 1829. (died 1847)
 September 18 – Joseph Story, Associate Justice of the U.S. Supreme Court from 1811 till 1845. (died 1845)
 October – Henry W. Edwards, United States Senator from Connecticut from 1823 till 1838. (died 1847)
 Date Unknown – George Poindexter, Governor of Mississippi in 1819 and from 1820 till 1822 and United States Senator from Mississippi from 1830 till 1835. (died 1853)

Deaths
James Cook February 14, 1779, Explorer and Navigator

See also
Timeline of the American Revolution (1760–1789)

External links
 

 
1770s in the United States
United States
United States
Years of the 18th century in the United States